The Betsiboka Bridge is a truss bridge over the Betsiboka River, in  the district of Maevatanana, which is a part of Betsiboka Region, Madagascar. It is one of the longest bridge on the island, appr. 350 meters long.

History 
The first bridge was one of the three suspension bridges erected in Madagascar by the French company G. Leinekugel Le Cocq & Fils between 1931 and 1934.

It was destroyed in World War II and, thereafter, replaced by the present truss bridge which was refurbished in 1980 and rehabilitated in 2015.

See also
 List of rivers of Madagascar

References

Bridges in Madagascar